English rule in Ireland spanned several centuries and involved British control of parts, or entirety, of the island of Ireland. British involvement in Ireland began with the English invasion of Ireland in 1169. Most of Ireland gained independence from the United Kingdom following the Anglo-Irish War in the early 20th century. Initially formed as a Dominion called the Irish Free State in 1922, the Republic of Ireland became a fully independent nation state following the passage of the Republic of Ireland Act in 1949. Northern Ireland remains part of the United Kingdom as a constituent country.

Middle Ages

From the late 12th century, the Anglo-Norman invasion of Ireland resulted in Anglo-Norman control of much of Ireland, over which the kings of England then claimed sovereignty. By the late Late Middle Ages, Anglo-Norman control was limited to an area around Dublin known as the Pale.

Enacted in 1494, Poynings law ensured that the Irish parliament could not meet without the approval of England's monarch and Privy Council. In 1541, English king Henry VIII changed Ireland's status from a lordship to a kingdom, and he was proclaimed King of Ireland.

Plantation and rebellion 

The Ulster Plantation began in the 16th century and involved the settling of English and Scottish Protestants in Ulster.

Coinciding largely with the Eleven Years' War, the Cromwellian conquest of Ireland was led by Oliver Cromwell between 1649 and 1651, resulting in the confiscation of land from many native landowners and regranting to Parliamentarian supporters.

Introduced in the 17th century, the Penal Laws outlawed the Catholic clergy and precluded Catholics in Ireland from owning or leasing land above a certain value, accessing higher education and certain professions, and gave primacy to the established church and the Church of Ireland. While these laws were later eased, including by the Treaty of Limerick which followed the Williamite War in Ireland (1688–1691), by 1778 Catholics still held only around 5% of land in Ireland.

18th and 19th centuries

The United Irishmen Rebellion of 1798 (which sought to end British rule in Ireland) failed, and the 1800 Act of Union merged the Kingdom of Ireland into a combined United Kingdom of Great Britain and Ireland.

In the mid-19th century, the Great Famine (1845–1851) resulted in the death or emigration of over two million people. At the time, trade agreements were controlled by the British government and whilst hundreds of thousands were suffering from hunger, Irish dairy products and wheat harvests were exported to Britain and other overseas territories.

Independence and partition 

A Home Rule Bill was passed in 1912 but not brought into law due to the outbreak of World War I in 1914. The Easter Rising of 1916 resulted in the execution of the rebellion's leaders. In the 1918 Irish general election, Sinn Féin won a majority of Irish seats and in 1919 these elected MPs declared the independence of the Irish Republic. The Irish War of Independence followed from 1919 to 1921. The Government of Ireland Act of 1920 and the Anglo-Irish Treaty of 1921 resulted in the formation of the Irish Free State, while Northern Ireland's MPs opted out to form Northern Ireland. Many foreign powers recognized Ireland's independence, like the United States in 1924. And Ireland was globally recognized as legitimate member of the world community by the time the United Nations was formed in the 1940s.

See also
 History of Ireland (1169–1536), when England invaded Ireland
 History of Ireland (1536–1691), when England conquered Ireland
 History of Ireland (1691–1801), the time of the Protestant Ascendency
 History of Ireland (1801–1923), when Ireland was merged with the United Kingdom

References

History of the British Empire
History of the British Isles
History of the Commonwealth of Nations
Monarchy in Ireland